The 2022 New York Attorney General election was held on November 8, 2022. Incumbent Democratic Attorney General Letitia James was eligible for re-election, however originally decided to run for Governor of New York in 2022. On December 9, 2021, however, James suspended her gubernatorial campaign and announced that she would seek re-election as attorney general. Republicans nominated Michael Henry, an attorney from Queens. James defeated Henry by a margin of 9.2%, a massive underperformance from her 27.2% victory in 2018. 

Between every statewide race in New York in 2022, this is the only one where the incumbent (Letitia James) refused to debate their opponent.

Democratic primary 
After incumbent attorney general Letitia James announced her candidacy for governor of New York, several other Democrats launched campaigns for attorney general. When James suspended her campaign for governor and announced that she would seek re-election instead, those candidates ended their campaigns for attorney general and endorsed James. As of June 23, 2022, James had no primary challengers. The Democratic primary for AG was cancelled and James advanced to the November general election.

Candidates

Official designee
 Letitia James, incumbent attorney general (2019–present) (previously ran for Governor)

Withdrew
Dan Goldman, former assistant U.S. Attorney for the Southern District of New York (2007–2017) and former general counsel for the U.S. House Intelligence Committee (2019–2020) (running for U.S. House, endorsed James)
Shelley Mayer, state senator from the 37th district (2018–present) (running for re-election, endorsed James)
Zephyr Teachout, Fordham University Associate Professor, candidate for governor in 2014, nominee for NY-19 in 2016, and candidate for attorney general in 2018 (endorsed James)
Clyde Vanel, state assemblyman for the 33rd District of New York (2017–present) (running for re-election, endorsed James)
Maria Vullo, former Superintendent of the New York State Department of Financial Services (endorsed James)

Declined
Michael Gianaris, state senator from the 12th district (2011–present); Deputy Majority Leader of the New York State Senate (2019–present); state assemblymember from the 36th district (2001–2010) (running for re-election, endorsed James)
Laura Gillen, former town supervisor of Hempstead (2018–2019) (running for U.S. House)
Sean Patrick Maloney, U.S. representative for NY-18 (2015–present); candidate for attorney general in 2018 (running for re-election, endorsed James)
Kathleen Rice, U.S. representative for NY-04 (2015–present) (endorsed James)
Thomas Suozzi, U.S. representative for NY-3 (2017–present) (running for governor)

Endorsements

Polling

Republican primary 
Two candidates, John Sarcone and Michael Henry, competed for the Republican nomination. In a surprise move, Sarcone declined to be nominated at the state Republican convention, leading to Michael Henry earning the endorsement unanimously.

Candidates

Official designee
 Michael Henry, attorney

Declined
 Joseph Holland, former Commissioner of the New York State Department of Housing and Community Renewal and candidate for attorney general in 1994 and 2018

Withdrew
 John Sarcone, former General Services Administration official

Endorsements

Conservative primary

Candidates

Official designee
 Michael Henry, attorney

General election

Predictions

Endorsements

Polling 
Graphical summary

Generic Democrat vs. generic Republican with Andrew Cuomo as an independent

Results

Notes 

Partisan clients

References

External links 
Official campaign websites 
Michael Henry (R) for Attorney General
Letitia James (D) for Attorney General

New York Attorney General elections
New York
2022 New York (state) elections